John Alfred Scali (April 27, 1918 – October 9, 1995) was the United States Ambassador to the United Nations from 1973 to 1975. From 1961 he was also a long time correspondent for ABC News.

As a correspondent for ABC, Scali became an intermediary during the Cuban Missile Crisis and later a part of the Nixon Administration. Scali gained fame after it became known in 1964 that in October 1962, a year after he joined ABC News, he had carried a critical message from KGB Colonel Aleksandr Fomin (the cover name for Alexander Feklisov) to U.S. officials. He left ABC in 1971 to serve as a foreign affairs adviser to President Nixon, becoming U.S. Ambassador to the United Nations in 1973. Scali re-joined ABC in 1975 where he worked until retiring in 1993.

Scali was contacted by Soviet embassy official (and KGB Station Chief) Fomin about a proposed settlement to the crisis, and subsequently he acted as a contact between Fomin and the Executive Committee. However, it was without government direction that Scali responded to new Soviet conditions with a warning that a U.S. invasion was only hours away, prompting the Soviets to settle the crisis quickly.

References

External links 
 
 Arlington National Cemetery biography
 

1918 births
1995 deaths
20th-century American politicians
American officials of the United Nations
American people of Italian descent
Burials at Arlington National Cemetery
Ford administration cabinet members
Nixon administration cabinet members
Permanent Representatives of the United States to the United Nations
ABC News people
American television journalists